Beijing Hyundai Motor Co., Ltd. is an automobile manufacturing company headquartered in Shunyi, Beijing, China, and a joint-venture between BAIC Motor and Hyundai Motor Company. Established in 2002, it manufactures in Shunyi District, a satellite city of Beijing, producing Hyundai-branded automobiles for the Chinese market.

In 2016, the company was reported as selling nearly 1.8 million vehicles.

History
In May 2002, Hyundai Motor and the Beijing Automotive Group signed a memorandum of understanding with the aim of creating a joint venture based around an existing Beijing factory. Hyundai begun to improve the plant's installations, and on 18 October 2002 an equally owned joint venture between the two companies was established. While it was not the first arrangement between a foreign and a domestic automaker, Beijing Hyundai was the first to be approved by the Chinese government after its entry into the World Trade Organization. The joint venture initially expanded its production output through importation of key parts from South Korea and the creation of an integrated, Korean-owned supply network inside China. As of 2012, average per year production since 2003 stands at roughly 370,000 vehicles, but yearly output has continued to grow over the lifetime of the project.

2014 saw the company sell 1,120,000 vehicles.

Products
At least four Hyundai models have been solely sold on the Chinese market. These are: BT01, indigenously designed; Lingxiang, an interior-and-feature localized Sonata NF; Elantra Yuedong, a localized version of the Elantra; and Verna, a city car. All are tailored to Chinese tastes. The 5th generation Elantra is sold in China as the Langdong, but little localization is likely to have occurred. Current products available exclusively in China includes

Current production

Former production

Current Imported

Former Imported

Shouwang brand
Cheaper products may be sold under a new, China-only brand name, Shouwang. A concept vehicle was shown at car shows in China in 2011 and 2012, but the brand does not appear to have been launched.

Production bases and facilities
As of 2013, the company has at least three production bases as well as an R&D center, all of which are probably in the Linhe Industrial Development Zone of the Shunyi District, a satellite city of Beijing. Two of these produce automobiles and the other, engines.

Its first automobile production base was completed in 2003 and the second in April 2008. Construction on a third Beijing base begun in late 2010 should be complete in the second half of 2012. At least one of these facilities is 17 km from Shunyi Yangzhen.

A new site outside Beijing was inaugurated in 2016, and this Hebei location was producing a small city car, the Accent, as of 2017.

In 2017, Beijing Hyundai opened its Chongqing plant, Which produces the Reina subcompact sedan until 2021.

See also 
 List of Hyundai Motor Company manufacturing facilities

References

External links 
 Beijing Hyundai Motor Official Site 
 Genesis Motor China Official Site 
 Picture of a Beijing Hyundai building

BAIC Group joint ventures
Beijing
Car manufacturers of China
Vehicle manufacturing companies established in 2002
Chinese companies established in 2002
Shunyi District
Chinese-foreign joint-venture companies